Italo (also known as Italo Barocco) is a 2014 Italian comedy film written and directed by Alessia Scarso. It is based on the true story of a mongrel dog that thanks to its skills earned the honorary citizenship of Scicli, Ragusa.

Cast   
 Marco Bocci as Antonio Blanco
 Elena Radonicich as Laura
 Barbara Tabita as Luisa Nigro
  Vincenzo Lauretta as  Meno
 Martina Antoci as Chiara
 Matteo Korreshi as  Paolo
Lucia Sardo as  Concetta
 Andrea Tidona  as  Mario
 Marcello Perracchio as  Marcello
Tuccio Musumeci as Natalino
Leo Gullotta as Narrator (voice)

References

External links 

2014 films
2014 comedy films
Italian comedy films
Films set in Sicily
Films about dogs
Comedy films based on actual events
2014 directorial debut films
2010s Italian films